A school song, alma mater, school hymn or school anthem is the patronal song of a school. In England, this tradition is particularly strong in public schools and grammar schools.

Australia 
The Glennie School – Now Thank We All Our God
Somerville House – Our God, Our Help in Ages Past
St Ursula's College, Kingsgrove - Serviam, Ignite the Spirit

Canada 
Upper Canada College – Praise My Soul, the King of Heaven
Bishop's College School – And did those feet in ancient time (Jerusalem) & Lennoxville Vivat Dicimus

England 
Barnard Castle School – "Jerusalem"
Douai School - "Ad Multos Annos"
Haberdashers' Aske's Boys' School – "Jerusalem"
Harrow School – "Forty Years On"
The Skinners' School – "The Leopard Song"
The Judd School – Jerusalem
King Edward VI Grammar School, Chelmsford – Jerusalem
Millfield School – Jerusalem
The London Oratory School - "Quam Bonum Est"
Oundle School – "Carmen Undeliense"
Reigate Grammar School – "To Be a Pilgrim"
Sherborne School - The Carmen
Stamford High School - “Within these walls of grey”
The Old Stamfordian Club (Alumni association of Stamford School) - “Schola Stamfordiensis”
Tonbridge School - "Of Him Who Dreamed of Founding"
William Hulme's Grammar School – "The Hulme Song" and "Jerusalem"

India 
Carmel Convent High School, Durgapur – Within Thy Hallowed Portals Carmel Dear
Cathedral School, Lucknow – We'll Raise The Banner Of Our School, And See It Flying High

Loyola School, Thiruvananthapuram – Cheer Loyola's sons
St. Paul's School, Darjeeling – The Alma mater
St. Ann's High School, Secunderabad – Scenes Of Our Childhood

New Zealand 
Dilworth School – St Patrick's Breastplate
Auckland Grammar School – Per Angusta Ad Augusta set to the music of A Mighty Fortress is Our God

Pakistan 
Pakistan School Song – This poem (prayer) was sung as school song in almost all the Pakistani schools.

Scotland 
Royal High School – Vivas Schola Regia

Sri Lanka 
St. Anthony's college, Kandy      - "Rally Round The Banners of The College"

United States 

Cornell University – "Far Above Cayuga's Waters"
Harvard University – "Fair Harvard"
Columbia University – "Stand, Columbia"
Dartmouth College – "Dear Old Dartmouth"
Princeton University – "Old Nassau"
Rutgers University – "On the Banks of the Old Raritan"
San Jose State University — "San José State Alma Mater"
University of California, Los Angeles – "Hail to the Hills of Westwood"
University of Florida – "We Are the Boys from Old Florida"
University of Georgia – "Glory, Glory"
University of Illinois at Urbana–Champaign – "Illinois Loyalty", "Hail to the Orange"
University of Iowa – "Alma Mater Iowa"
University of Miami – "Alma Mater: Stand Forever" 
University of Michigan – "The Yellow and Blue"
University of Minnesota - “The Minnesota Rouser”, “Hail! Minnesota”
University of New Hampshire – "UNH Alma Mater"
University of North Dakota – "UND Alma Mater"
University of Texas at Austin – "The Eyes of Texas"
Texas A&M University – "Spirit of Aggieland"
University of Wisconsin – "Varsity (song)", "On, Wisconsin!"
College of William and Mary - "Our Alma Mater", "William and Mary Hymn"

See also
 Fight song

Notes

Anthems
 School songs